Mostafa Roustaei is an Iranian amateur astronomer and retired fighter pilot who flew with Grumman F-14 Tomcat during the Iran–Iraq War. French military historian Pierre Razoux has credited him with 5 aerial victories, a record that qualifies him as a flying ace.

Career 
Roustaei was hired in the IIAF in 1970 and after 30 years of service, he was retired with the rank of colonel. He served for some time as the chief operations officer of the 6th Tactical Fighter Base. A U.S. trained pilot, he was graduated from AETC course at Laughlin Air Force Base in 1974. He was subsequently certified with F-4D/E Phantom II, an aircraft he flew for 2200 hours before switching to F-14 Tomcat. He flew a further 2086 hours with the latter.

Aerial victories 

According to aviation author Kash Ryan, Roustaei's aerial victories verified by his logbooks and corroborated with other accounts include four using AIM-54 Phoenix missile and one manoeuvre kill, against two MiG-23s, a MiG-21 and a pair of Dassault Mirage F1s. The details are as follows:

See also 

 List of Iranian flying aces

References 

Iran–Iraq War flying aces
Iranian flying aces
Living people
Islamic Republic of Iran Army colonels
1951 births
Amateur astronomers
Iranian military personnel of the Iran–Iraq War
Islamic Republic of Iran Air Force personnel